University Of Baltistan or Baltistan University (UOBS) (Urdu: جامعہ بلتستان سکردو; Balti: ༑། ཡུ་ནི་ཝྲ་སིཊི་ ཨཕ་ སྦལ་ཏིས་ཏན །༑།)  is an international level university in Skardu, Gilgit-Baltistan, Pakistan. It was established in 2017 with a charter by the Federal Government of Pakistan, with the goal of improving access to higher education for the people of Gilgit-Baltistan.

There are seven departments - Computer Sciences, Biological Sciences, Mathematics, Chemistry, Business Management , Educational Development and Language and Cultural Studies.

History 
According to its charter, University of Baltistan is a multi-campus university. Additional campuses are seeking to be established in wherever feasible.

Degrees and programs 
 Master in Business Management-MBA
 Master in Educational Development-MA Education
 Master in Languages & Cultural Studies-MA English

 Bachelor of Science in Computer Science BSCS
 Bachelor of Business Administration-BBA 

 Bachelor of Arts in English (BA Hons)
 Bachelor of Science in Chemistry (BS)

 Bachelor of Science in Biology (Zoology) (BS)
 Bachelor of Science in Biology (Botany) (BS)
 Bachelor of Science in Mathematics (BS)
 Tourism and Hospitality Management (Certificate Programs)

It was also announced that Chinese lessons would be offered in order to increase trade ties with China.

Campuses 
Currently main campus is situated on Kargil Road Hussainabad in Skardu. later it will be shifted to Main Campus under construction on riverside.

City Campus Satellite Town skardu

Sundus Campus Subdus Skardu

Anchan Campus near Dr. Irshad Ali Chowk Skardu.

See also 
 Karakarum International University
 University of Karachi
 University of the Punjab
 University of Peshawar
 University of Gujrat

References

External links 
 
 First VC of university of Baltistan
 UOBS interviewed 18 candidates for PhD.

Educational institutions established in 2017
Public universities and colleges in Pakistan
Universities and colleges in Gilgit-Baltistan
2017 establishments in Pakistan